Polyphagozerra is a genus of moths in the family Cossidae.

Species
 Polyphagozerra coffeae (Nietner, 1861)
 Polyphagozerra reticulata (Joicey et Talbot, 1916)

References

Natural History Museum Lepidoptera generic names catalog

Zeuzerinae